Where I Am is the debut extended play by Danish-Australian singer Anja Nissen. It was released on 5 May 2017.

In an interview with Good Evening Europe, Nissen explained the EP has songs that mean a lot to her "with personal feelings attached to them and they are uplifting and feel good". She said, "All songs I've written... I have so much more music to give and so much more music to share. I'm sure all the Eurovision fans are going to love it."

Reception
Jovana Radojevic of Wiwibloggs reviewed the EP complementing Anja's vocal gymnastics, her power and range. She likened tracks to those of Girls Aloud, Rachel Stevens and Christina Aguilera. She complemented the "electrorock-influenced "Before You Were Cool"" and noted it as "one of the highlights of the EP."

Track listing

Release history

References

2017 EPs
Anja Nissen albums
EPs by Australian artists
Mercury Records EPs